Fairmount Heavy Transport is a Dutch shipping company that operates two semi-submersible heavy transport vessels, Fairmount Fjord and Fairmount Fjell. Both are being converted at Malta Shipyards in 2007/2008. Commercial management is performed by Fairmount Heavy Transport itself, since 1 August 2007 independently from Fairmount Marine. Fairmount Heavy Transport was founded in 2005 and based in Rotterdam. It is listed on the Oslo Stock Exchange.

Shipping companies of the Netherlands
Transport companies established in 2005